The 2015 Road to the Kentucky Oaks was a points system by which three-year-old fillies qualified for the 2015 Kentucky Oaks. The point system replaced a previous qualifying system which was based on graded stakes earnings.

The 2015 season consisted of 31 races, 17 for the Kentucky Oaks Prep Season and 14 for the Kentucky Oaks Championship Series. Condo Commando was the leading qualifier with 161 points, earned by winning the Demoiselle (10 points), Busher (50 points) and Gazelle (100 points), plus a fourth-place finish in the Frizette. I'm a Chatterbox also finished with 161 points, earned by winning the Silverbulletday (10 points), Rachel Alexandra (50 points) and Fair Grounds Oaks (100 points), plus finishing fourth in the Golden Rod (1 point). The Oaks was won by Lovely Maria, who qualified with 120 points, earned by winning the Ashland Stakes (100 points) and finishing second in the Rachel Alexandra (20 points).

Standings

Prep season

Championship Series

References

Kentucky Oaks
Road to the Kentucky Oaks
Road to the Kentucky Oaks